Stefan Mitrović (born 22 May 1990) is a Serbian professional footballer who plays as a centre-back for La Liga club Getafe and the Serbia national team.

Club career
On 9 June 2012, Mitrović signed a three-year deal with Kortrijk in the Belgian Pro League.

On 7 May 2013, he moved to Benfica on a five-year contract, joining a host of fellow countrymen. During his first six months, he only appeared for the reserve team. On 22 January 2014 he was loaned until the end of the season to Real Valladolid.

On 16 July 2014, Mitrović signed with SC Freiburg for a €1.175 million transfer fee. He made his debut on 4 October 2014, against Werder Bremen. He signed for French club RC Strasbourg from Belgian club Gent in June 2018. On 6 July 2021, Getafe announced the signing of Mitrović from Strasbourg.

International career
Mitrović made his debut for the Serbia national team on 31 May 2014, against Panama.

On 14 October 2014, he took down the flag of "Greater Albania" during a UEFA Euro 2016 qualifying match in Belgrade that was flown over the pitch by a remote control drone.

In November 2022, he was selected in Serbia's squad for the 2022 FIFA World Cup in Qatar. He played in a group stage match against Cameroon, coming on as a sub in 55th minute, replacing Strahinja Pavlović.

Career statistics

Club

International

Honours
Strasbourg
Coupe de la Ligue: 2018–19

References

External links

 
 

1990 births
Living people
Footballers from Belgrade
Association football defenders
Serbian footballers
Serbia international footballers
FC Petržalka players
SC Freiburg players
Real Valladolid players
S.L. Benfica B players
Czech First League players
FC Zbrojovka Brno players
FK Metalac Gornji Milanovac players
K.V. Kortrijk players
K.A.A. Gent players
RC Strasbourg Alsace players
Getafe CF footballers
Belgian Pro League players
Slovak Super Liga players
Serbian SuperLiga players
Liga Portugal 2 players
La Liga players
Bundesliga players
Ligue 1 players
Serbian expatriate footballers
Serbian expatriate sportspeople in Slovakia
Expatriate footballers in Slovakia
Serbian expatriate sportspeople in the Czech Republic
Expatriate footballers in the Czech Republic
Serbian expatriate sportspeople in Belgium
Expatriate footballers in Belgium
Serbian expatriate sportspeople in Portugal
Expatriate footballers in Portugal
Serbian expatriate sportspeople in Spain
Expatriate footballers in Spain
Serbian expatriate sportspeople in Germany
Expatriate footballers in Germany
Serbian expatriate sportspeople in France
Expatriate footballers in France
2022 FIFA World Cup players